Bardyny  is a village in the administrative district of Gmina Wilczęta, within Braniewo County, Warmian-Masurian Voivodeship, in northern Poland.

The village has a population of 133.

References

Bardyny